The 2017 World Minifootball Federation World Cup was the second edition of the WMF World Cup, the world championship for men's national minifootball teams organized by the World Minifootball Federation. The tournament was contested in Nabeul city in Tunisia from 06–15 October 2017.

Venue
All the matches of 2017 WMF World Cup are played in the Nabeul Minifoot Stadium, Nabeul. This stadium is temporary built to host the competition and is stripped down after the end of the event.

Teams and draw

Teams
Unlike in the 2015 WMF World Cup, 24 teams from 5 continents are qualified for the final tournament:

Africa:

  (Host Nation)

Americas:

Asia:

Europe:

Oceania:

Draw
On June 11, 2017, the Executive bureau of the World Minifootball Federation had unanimously decided in Brno, Czech Republic that the 2017 World Cup will be organized from October 6 to October 16, 2017.

On September 6, 2017, The final draw for 2017 WMF World Cup was made in Tunis. For the draw, the 24 teams were divided into four seeding pots:

Group stage
The winners and runners-up of each group and the best four third-placed teams advance to the round of 16. The rankings of teams in each group are determined as follows:

If two or more teams are equal on the basis of the above three criteria, their rankings are determined as follows:

All times listed below are at local time (UTC+1)

Group A

Group B

Group C

Group D

Group E

Group F

Knockout stage
In the knockout stage, the sixteen teams play a single-elimination tournament.

Round of 16

Quarterfinals

Semifinals

Third-place match

Final

Final ranking

 Winners: Czech Republic

Awards

References

External links
2017 WMF World Cup official website
World Minifooball Federation official website

2017
International association football competitions hosted by Tunisia
2017 in Tunisian sport
October 2017 sports events in Africa